Makarikha is a rural locality (a village) in Sergeikhinskoye Rural Settlement, Kameshkovsky District, Vladimir Oblast, Russia. The population was 33 as of 2010.

Geography 
Makarikha is located 13 km west of Kameshkovo (the district's administrative centre) by road. Dmitrikovo is the nearest rural locality.

References 

Rural localities in Kameshkovsky District
Vladimirsky Uyezd